K158 or K-158 may refer to:

K-158 (Kansas highway), a former state highway in Kansas
HMCS Saskatoon (K158), a former Canadian Navy ship